WeRe Bank is a movement which has come to the attention of the Financial Conduct Authority and other governing bodies. Created by sovereign citizen Alan Peter Smith, now calling himself "Peter of England.” England claims to have support "both on planet and off planet" for his project. The concept has gained publicity mainly via websites promoting alternative lifestyles, conspiracy theories and fringe theories.

The basis of WeRe Bank's philosophy for financial liberation is that of the "promissory note, futures contract," The Bank Charter Act of 1844 and The Bills of Exchange Act 1882 which Peter of England claims to use to provide "lawful backing to the issuance of cheques" for the payment exclusively of debt burdens incurred by WeRe Bank of England members. The most prominent feature of the concept is the "WeRe Bank cheque books" provided by Peter of England to Re Movement members. These have the appearance of a standard British bank cheque, and several websites have encouraged their readers to become WeRe members and attempt to use the cheques to settle debts such as mortgage arrears, loan repayments or utility bills. Because WeRe Bank is not a bank within the British Cheque and Credit Clearing Company system or even a company, and because WeRe Bank does not subscribe to the standards of the UK Payments Administration nor any of the world's clearing houses, the payees will not receive payment of the amounts on the cheques, meaning that the debt is unpaid, and can be increased by late payment fees, return check charges and legal costs.
 
Financial regulators in the UK (including the Financial Conduct Authority and the Financial Ombudsman Service) and in several other jurisdictions have published warnings to the public about WeRe Bank.

WeRe Bank cheques
WeRe Bank was launched in April 2015. Peter of England sold books of cheques to WeRe members. At various times the number of cheques has varied from 25 to 50. The layout of each document closely resembles a normal British bank cheque, and displays the number 75-01-81 in the format and position where a standard cheque would contain the sort code of the issuing bank - in effect the reversed DOB of Peter of England acts as the sort code validation, again ensuring that the issued cheques are unmistakable for any other banks' issuance. Peter of England's date of birth is 18-10-57 and the code is formed from these digits reversed.

As the cheques have superficially the appearance of a standard cheque, they may be accepted by the cash office of a payee company, who will then pass them to their bank along with regular cheques. Because they are not cheques drawn on a regular bank, it is not possible for them to clear through the normal system operated by Cheque and Credit Clearing Company. Indeed, Peter of England made it clear on the WeRe Bank website and Facebook page that WeRe Bank is not a member of any recognized clearing house such as the Cheque and Credit Clearing Company or the Society for Worldwide Interbank Financial Telecommunication.

WeRe Bank cheques as a form of debt elimination
During May and June 2015, a number of websites and activists campaigning against the mainstream banking system, began promoting use of WeRe Bank cheques as a way to settle "public" debts such as mortgage debts, credit card and council tax debts, loan repayments or utilities. This is even though WeRe Bank does not accept money in the form of deposits from individual members, and Peter of England's website makes clear no transfer of funds will be made into the accounts of the payee companies unless they sign up to use the SWALLOW system of transfer for funds.
Peter of England refuses to acknowledge the possibility of using the SWIFT system to transfer funds to potential creditors as "a criminal conduit for the continued exploitation of the people and an overt method of funding war, totalitarianism, human trafficking and every other pernicious activity man could mischievously think of."

Financial basis of the bank
When an individual becomes a member of WeRe Bank of England, they are required to deposit a promissory note to the value of £150,000/148,000 Re. By this the member promises to pay that sum to WeRe Bank within ten years. Peter of England has stated that "over the past [period] since 2012, the people that have come on prior to this new formation have all pledged promissory notes to WeRe Bank. I think that rests at the moment at between £1-1.5 billion that has been pledged already ... so according to conventional financial practice we are able to say that we have assets." England maintains that this means on the basis of these assets, the bank is able to back up any WeRe cheque and therefore the cheque should be accepted for value as if it were itself a promissory note. Members also pay a £25 joining fee, and membership fees of £10 per month.

Regulator reaction
In September 2015, the UK's Financial Conduct Authority posted a "Consumer Notice" regarding WeRe Bank. This opened by saying that "The FCA has received many reports from consumers, public bodies and commercial organisations about an entity styling itself as WeRe Bank. Find out more about WeRe Bank's activities and why we have some concerns about it." The notice continued:

The Financial Ombudsman Service gave a similar warning: 

Other regulators, including the Irish Central Bank and New Zealand Banking Ombudsman Scheme, have also issued warnings.

.

See also
Redemption movement – another source of worthless check-like drafts based on a fringe theory.

References

Finance fraud
Confidence tricks
Fraud in England
Fringe theories